The commissioner of the Royal Canadian Mounted Police is the professional head of the Royal Canadian Mounted Police (RCMP). The commissioner exercises control and management of the RCMP under the direction of the minister of public safety. The position is a Governor in Council appointment made on the advice of the prime minister of Canada.

In addition to his or her role in the management of the RCMP, the commissioner serves as Principal Commander of the Order of Merit of the Police Forces. Under the Firearms Act, the RCMP commissioner also serves as the commissioner of firearms, the chief executive of the Canadian Firearms Program.

Brenda Lucki was the 24th commissioner of the RCMP, taking office on April 16, 2018 and serving until her retirement in March 17, 2023.

Queen Elizabeth II was honorary commissioner-in-chief from 2012 to 2022, and King Charles III has been honorary commissioner of the RCMP since 2012. However, neither appointment exercises a substantive role in the operation of the organization.

List of commissioners
There have been 24 commissioners, including two acting commissioners and one interim commissioner, since the founding of the North-West Mounted Police in 1873:

References

External links 
 RCMP Executive Committee
 Former RCMP commissioners
 Diary of Commissioner George French

Canadian